The Deputy Chief Minister of the Punjab is a member of the Cabinet of Punjab Government in the Government of Punjab, India. Not a constitutional office, it seldom carries any specific powers. A deputy chief minister usually also holds a cabinet portfolio such as home minister or finance minister. In the parliamentary system of government, the Chief Minister is treated as the "first among equals" in the cabinet; the position of deputy chief minister is used to bring political stability and strength within a coalition government or in a party.

History

PEPSU
In history of PEPSU state there was only one deputy chief minister Brish Bhan.

Punjab
Till now three people served as Deputy CM of Punjab. Balram Das Tandon was the first who hold the position when Bhartiya Jana Sangh formed coalition government with Akali Dal – Sant Fateh Singh under the chief ministership of Gurnam Singh. Then in 2004 former Chief Minister Rajinder Kaur Bhattal became the Deputy CM under chief ministership of Amarinder Singh. Sukhbir Singh Badal is the only one who served the position for thrice. In 2021 for the first time two persons, Sukhjinder Singh Randhawa and Om Parkash Soni appointed deputy cm under Charanjit Singh Channi.

List of Deputy Chief Ministers

PEPSU

Punjab

See also 
List of current Indian deputy chief ministers

References

Deputy chief ministers of Punjab, India
Punjab
Lists of people from Punjab, India